Hovhannes Hovhannisyan (– 29 September 1929) was an Armenian poet, linguist, translator and educator. He was a key contributor to the Ashkharabar (Modern Armenian) literature movement and a promoter of literacy in Armenia. He has been called the founder of Classic Armenian poetry.

Biography
Hovhannisyan was born into a peasant family in Vagharshapat, then within the Erivan Governorate of the Russian Empire. He attended parochial school in Armenia before studying in Moscow at the Lazaryan Language Institute (1877–83) and Moscow State University (1884-88).

In 1889, he traveled around Europe visiting various cities, including Constantinople, London, Paris and Vienna. Hovhannisyan returned to Vagharshapat and began his teaching career at Gevorkian Seminary, lecturing on Greek and Russian languages and literature. He taught until 1912.

Hovhannisyan greatly enriched Modern Armenian through his own work as well as translations. Together with Russian writer Valery Bryusov, he became the first to translate ancient Armenian manuscripts into Modern Armenian. He also translated works from classic and then-contemporary writers, including Homer, Shakespeare, Goethe, Hugo,  Ibsen, Nekrasov, Pushkin, and Schiller.

He was a supporter of the 1917 Russian Revolution and the creation of the Soviet Union. In 1922, he worked in the Council of People's Commissars setting up the new Armenian Soviet Socialist Republic.

Hovhannisyan died in 1929 in Yerevan, aged 65. He was buried at the old Mler cemetery in the city, which was soon after developed into the Komitas Pantheon, the resting place for many of Armenia's most prominent cultural icons.

Works

In 1883, Hovhannisyan had his first poem published, Spring. His subjects included love and nature, as well as tragedy and the hard life of Armenia's peasantry. He eventually published three volumes of his works in 1887, 1908 and 1912.

Poetry

 Spring, 1883
, 1884
, 1887
, 1885
, 1888
, 1883
, 1887
, 1887
, 1886
, 1886
, 1887
, 1901
, 1880
, 1896
, 1887
, 1897
, 1896
, 1887

Essays
, 1887
, 1904
, 1904

Legacy

In 1948, his daughter established the Hovhannes Hovhannisyan Museum at the house where he was born in central Vagharshapat, near the Holy Mother of God Cathedral and the mayor's office. In 2009, it was reported that the museum was in a dilapidated state, but that the mayor's office of Vagharshapat intended to see it repaired.

See also

 Hovhannes Tumanyan
 Armenian language
 Armenian literature

References

External links
 Works available on Wikisource
English translations of his work

1864 births
1929 deaths
19th-century Armenian poets
Linguists from Armenia
People from Vagharshapat
19th-century Armenian writers
20th-century Armenian writers
Armenian translators
Burials at the Komitas Pantheon
Moscow State University alumni
Armenian male poets
19th-century male writers
20th-century male writers
19th-century translators
Armenian people from the Russian Empire